Maksym Startsev (born 20 January 1980) is a Ukrainian former goalkeeper and coach, 2014. After annexation of Crimea by Russia, he received his Russian citizenship and changed his name to Maksim Startsev.

Career
He last played for Metalurh Zaporizhya in the Ukrainian Premier League. He has also played for Kryvbas Kryvyi Rih, Dnipro Dnipropetrovsk, and Tavriya Simferopol, all in the Ukrainian Premier League.

In 2014, after the annexation of the Crimea to Russia, he received a Russian citizenship as Maksim Startsev.

External links
Official team website
Football Federation of Ukraine Profile 

1980 births
Living people
Ukrainian footballers
Ukraine international footballers
Association football goalkeepers
SC Tavriya Simferopol players
Sportspeople from Kherson
FC Dnipro players
FC Kryvbas Kryvyi Rih players
FC Metalist Kharkiv players
Ukrainian Premier League players
FC Volyn Lutsk players
FC Metalurh Zaporizhzhia players
Crimean Premier League managers
FC Krymteplytsia Molodizhne managers
FC TSK Simferopol managers
Naturalised citizens of Russia
Russian football managers